John Donowell (floreat 1753–1786) was an eighteenth-century British architect and engraver, considered to be the equivalent of Thomas Sandby and Thomas Malton as one of the principal architect-draughtsmen in the third quarter of the eighteenth century. He exhibited in 1761 at the Free Society, then through the 1760s at the Society of Artists, and from 1778 to 1786 at the Royal Academy; prints, some hand-coloured, were published at this time.

 
Donowell made a number of topographical drawings, mostly views of London, such as of the Grand Walk in the then-fashionable Marylebone Gardens.

References

Further reading 

 Colvin, Howard, A Biographical Dictionary of British Architects 1600-1840, 3rd edition (New Haven and London: Yale University Press, 1995), pp. 316-317.

 National Archives, National Register of Archives, Will of John Donowell, Architect of Kensington, Middlesex, PROB 11/1240.

 Symes, Michael, "John Donowell's Views of Chiswick and other Gardens", Journal of Garden History, 7, 1987, pp. 43-57.

Donowell, John